Forever Young is a 2018 Chinese epic drama film written and directed by Li Fangfang. The film stars Zhang Ziyi, Huang Xiaoming, Chang Chen, Wang Leehom and Chen Chusheng. The film is about four generations of Tsinghua University graduates, spanning a hundred years of modern Chinese history since World War I, from the 1920s, the 1940s, the 1960s till nowadays, and how no matter how time changes, there are always people who insist on their dreams.

The film entered production in early 2012, with principal photography concluding in the same year. Filming locations include Beijing, Yunnan, Gansu and Guangdong. It was released on January 12, 2018.

With over US$118 million box office, Forever Young received the largest box office ticket sales of January 2018 in China.

The movie was critically acclaimed and both Zhang Ziyi and Wang Leehom won Best Actress and Best Actor respectively at the 2018 Macau International Movie Festival.

Cast
 Zhang Ziyi as Wang Minjia
 Huang Xiaoming as Chen Peng 
 Chang Chen as Zhang Guoguo 
 Wang Leehom as Shen Guangyao 
 Chen Chusheng as Wu Jinglan
 Zu Feng as Mei Yiqi
 Russell Wong as General 
 Paul Philip Clark as US Airman 
 Han Tongsheng as Robert
 Yao Chen
 Michelle Yim as Shen Guangyao's mother
 Jonathan Wu
 Tie Zheng as Li Xiang 
 Wu Jinyan as Lin Huiyin
 Huang Wei as Zhou Shulun

Theme songs
"Wu Wen" (无问) by Mao Buyi
"Wu Wen Xi Dong" (无问西东) by Faye Wong

Production
Production started in 2011 and ended in 2012. The film was originally shot to commemorate the 100th anniversary of Tsinghua University in 2011, with a budget of over 100 million yuan. The film was slated for release at the end of 2014 but was postponed to 2018.

References

External links

2018 films
2010s Mandarin-language films
2018 war drama films
Chinese war drama films
2018 drama films